Blaney is a surname. Notable people with the surname include:

 Alan Blayney (born 1981), football goalkeeper from Northern Ireland
 Benjamin Blayney (1728–1801), English divine and Hebraist
 Dave Blaney (born 1962), semi-retired American stock car racing driver
 Dave Blaney (born 1947 in Poole, UK), professional footballer with Southampton Football Club
 Dorothy B. Blaney (1921–1998), American stamp collector
 Ed Blaney (born 1951), American soccer player
 Frederick Blaney (1918–1988), Irish cricketer
 George Blaney (born 1939), American former basketball player and coach
 Greg Blaney, Irish Gaelic footballer and hurler
 Harry Blaney (1928–2013), Irish politician
 Ian Blayney (born 1962), Australian politician
 Isabella W. Blaney (1854–?), American suffragette
 James Blaney (born 1974), Irish former rugby union player and current coach
 James G. Blaney, major general in the US National Guard
 John Blayney (1925–2018), Irish rugby player, barrister, and Supreme Court judge
 John W. Blaney (born 1948), American diplomat
 Leah Blayney (born 1986), Australian soccer coach and former player
 Margaret-Ann Blaney, Canadian journalist and politician
 Max Blaney (1910–1940), Second World War British Army bomb defuser
 Neil Blaney  (1922–1995), Irish politician
 Reece Blayney (born 1985), Australian former rugby league footballer
 Ryan Blaney (born 1993), American stock car racing driver
 Steven Blaney (born 1965), Canadian businessman and politician 
 Steven Blaney (footballer) (born 1977), retired Welsh footballer 
 Tim Blaney (born 1959), American puppeteer and voice actor
 Vaughn Blaney, Canadian educator and political figure

See also
 Baron Blayney, an extinct title in the Peerage of Ireland, including a list of titleholders with the name
 Blayney (disambiguation)
 William Banks-Blaney (born 1973)